Brickellia corymbosa is a Mexican  species of flowering plants in the family Asteraceae. It is found in central and western Mexico, in the states of Jalisco, Michoacán, Puebla, and Oaxaca.

References

corymbosa
Flora of Mexico
Plants described in 1836